The Kawasaki KZ750 L3 a sport bike motorcycle made by Kawasaki starting in 1983. It was very similar to the 1982 Gpz750. This is the year during which the Gpzs made the jump towards "sportbikes", while the KZ line branched off as "sport cruisers". This model can be distinguished by the three horizontal stripes along the gas tank and tailpiece, orange, red and yellow, and the lack of fairing typical on GPZ bikes of the same era. The Kawasaki inline-four engines are considered very robust and reliable. Therefore, this motorcycle, and others with similar engines.

Specifications

Engine
4-stroke, DOHC, 750 cc inline four
Air cooled
Bore x stroke: 66.0 x 54.0 mm
Compression ratio: 9.5
Carbureted with Mikuni BS34 (four)
Electric starter
Transistorized battery and coil ignition system

References

KZ750L3